Firewood is the second album from the Swedish doom metal band Witchcraft. The album was released in 2005 by Rise Above Records. At roughly 8:50 in to the last track "Attention!", there is a cover of the Pentagram song "When the Screams Come". The vinyl edition does not include "When the Screams Come", but does include a bonus track entitled "The Invisible". This track also appears on the Japanese version released by Leaf Hound Records.

Track listing
 "Chylde of Fire" (Pelander) – 2:50
 "If Wishes Were Horses" (Pelander) – 3:16
 "Mr Haze" (Pelander) – 3:41
 "Wooden Cross (I Can't Wake the Dead)" (Pelander) – 4:46
 "Queen of Bees" (Pelander) – 5:13
 "Merlin's Daughter" (Pelander) – 1:32
 "I See a Man" (Pelander) – 3:59
 "Sorrow Evoker" (Pelander) – 5:44
 "You Suffer" (Pelander) – 2:43
 "The Invisible" (Pelander) - 4:59 (vinyl/Japan only bonus track)
 "Attention!/When the Screams Come" (Pelander/Liebling) – 11:40

References

External links
 

2005 albums
Witchcraft (band) albums
Rise Above Records albums